Wainwright may refer to:
 Wainwright (occupation), a tradesperson skilled in the making and repairing of carts or wagons
 Wainwright (surname), including the list of people

Places

Canada 
 Wainwright, Alberta, a town in Alberta
 Wainwright (provincial electoral district), former Alberta electoral district
 CFB Wainwright, Canadian Forces Base
 Municipal District of Wainwright No. 61, a municipal district in Alberta

United States 
 Wainwright, Alabama
 Wainwright, Alaska
 Fort Wainwright, United States Army base located near Fairbanks, Alaska
 Wainwright, Missouri
 Wainwright, Jackson County, Ohio
 Wainwright, Tuscarawas County, Ohio
 Wainwright, Oklahoma

Other uses 
 Wainwright (hill), one of 214 fells (hills and mountains) described in A. Wainwright's Pictorial Guide to the Lakeland Fells
 USC&GS Wainwright (1942) a survey ship in commission in the United States Coast and Geodetic Survey from 1942 to 1967
 USS Wainwright, name of three United States Navy ships
 Wainwright Building, landmark office building in St. Louis, Missouri

See also
 Justice Wainwright (disambiguation)